Sanjay Gupta (born  December 7, 1966) is an Indian comic book writer, editor, the studio head and Founder of Raj comics and is considered to be father of Indian Superheroes. 

Sanjay Gupta is one of the key people of Raj Comics, along with his brothers Manoj Gupta and Manish Gupta, He created the characters Nagraj, Doga, Bhokal, Yoddha, it is Nagraj who was the first superhero of India.

Early life and family 
Co-Founder Of Raja Pocket Books, Paperclip Books, Tricolor Books, Red Rabbit, Rajshree Prakashan, Harish Pocket Books, Raj Chitra Katha, King Comics, Fang Magazine, Raj Comics, Rc Motion Pictures And Raj Prem Films. Founder Of Alpha Book Publishers & Raj Comics By Sanjay Gupta.

Publishing career

Early career 
After finishing his studies in 1984, he joined his father Mr. Raj Kumar Gupta (Founder, Raja Pocket Books).

Alpha Book Publishers and Raj Comics By Sanjay Gupta was formed on 26 October 2020 on auspicious day of Vijayadashami as successor of Raja Pocket Books and Raj Comics and fondly known as RCSG among Comic Fans. 

RCSG has been serving their fans with number of original titles as well as quality reprints of comics originally published by Raj Comics since 1986.

List Of Published Original Comics

Writer and creator 
Mr. Sanjay Gupta was a huge fan of superheroes since childhood and always wanted to give India a homegrown superhero universe. His passion lead him develop the legendary Raj Comics Superhero Universe, as his passion led him to create the greatest and most-loved Indian superheroes like Nagraj, Doga, Bhokal, Parmanu, Tiranga, Anthony, Ashwaraj, Inspector Steel and several others.

Rise to Stardom - Nagraj 
Sanjay Gupta and Manoj Gupta created Nagraj who is a fictional superhero appearing in Indian comic books published by Raj Kumar Gupta under Raja Pocket Books in the late 1980s by Rajkumar Gupta. Nagraj first appeared in the comics Nagraj GENL #14 which was written by Parshuram Sharma and illustrated by Pratap Mullick.Nagraj is believed to have been inspired by the mythological Ichchhadhari Nag (shapeshifting snakes) and historical Vishmanushya . His stories create a rich blend of mythology, fantasy, magic, and science fiction. Over the time nagraj attainted a rich fandom.

Films 
In 2014, Anurag Kashyap had spoken about making a film on Doga—a vigilante killing machine in the style of Marvel Comics’ The Punisher—but the project was shelved after his Bombay Velvet flopped. Raj Comics co-founder and studio head Sanjay Gupta says "Bollywood is yet to warm up to the idea of licensing comic book characters that come with detailed universes and visuals ready for the screen. We want to start with animated Web series first. We are expecting to make our first live-action film the year after." In December 2017, Raj Comics organized special screening of their horror film Aadamkhor at Nagraj Janmotsav event, Delhi. Aadamkhor is based on comic of the same name published by Raj Comics in 1992.
Raj comics has released Aadamkhor on YouTube on 24 May 2018.

It was also announced in December 2019, that Ranveer Singh was in reports to play Nagraj in a film produced by Karan Johar. Looking forward to their film in 2022.

These announcement has been done from time to time but till now no movie has been released. There is statement by Anurag Kashyap on media that due to high expectation of publisher on stakes. It is impossible to work with them. 
Generations has been past and still there is zero chances of getting see these Raj Comics Superheroes in Big screen.

Notes

External links
 Raj Comics by Sanjay Gupta.

Raj Comics
Living people
1966 births